The Turkish–Armenian war, known in Turkey as the Eastern Front of the Turkish War of Independence, was a conflict between the First Republic of Armenia and the Turkish National Movement following the collapse of the Treaty of Sèvres in 1920. After the provisional government of Ahmet Tevfik Pasha failed to win support for ratification of the treaty, remnants of the Ottoman Army’s XV Corps under the command of Kâzım Karabekir attacked Armenian forces controlling the area surrounding Kars, eventually recapturing most of the territory in the South Caucasus that had been part of the Ottoman Empire prior to the Russo-Turkish War (1877–1878) and was subsequently ceded by Soviet Russia as part of the Treaty of Brest-Litovsk.

Karabekir had orders from the Ankara Government to "eliminate Armenia physically and politically". One estimate places the number of Armenians massacred by the Turkish army during the war at 100,000—this is evident in the marked decline (−25.1%) of the population of modern-day Armenia from 961,677 in 1919 to 720,000 in 1920. According to historian Raymond Kévorkian, only the Soviet occupation of Armenia prevented another Armenian genocide.

The Turkish military victory was followed by the Soviet Union's occupation and annexation of Armenia. The Treaty of Moscow (March 1921) between Soviet Russia and the Grand National Assembly of Turkey and the related Treaty of Kars (October 1921) confirmed most of the territorial gains made by Karabekir and established the modern Turkish–Armenian border.

Background 
The dissolution of the Russian Empire in the wake of the February Revolution saw the Armenians of the South Caucasus declaring their independence and formally establishing the First Republic of Armenia. In its two years of existence, the tiny republic, with its capital in Yerevan, was beset with a number of debilitating problems, ranging from fierce territorial disputes with its neighbors and a severe refugee crisis.

Armenia's most crippling problem was its dispute with its neighbor to the west, the Ottoman Empire. Approximately 1.5 million Armenians had perished during the Armenian genocide. Although the armies of the Ottoman Empire eventually occupied the South Caucasus in the summer of 1918 and stood poised to crush the republic, Armenia resisted until the end of October, when the Ottoman Empire capitulated to the Allied powers. Though the Ottoman Empire was partially occupied by the Allies, and while being invaded by Franco-Armenian forces during the Cilicia Campaign, the Turks did not withdraw their forces to the pre-war Russo-Turkish boundary until February 1919 and maintained many troops mobilized along this frontier.

Bolshevik and Turkish nationalist movements
During the First World War and in the ensuing peace negotiations in Paris, the Allies had vowed to punish the Turks and reward some, if not all, the eastern provinces of the empire to the nascent Armenian republic. But the Allies were more concerned with concluding the peace treaties with Germany and the other European members of the Central Powers. In matters related to the Near East, the principal powers, Great Britain, France, Italy and the United States, had conflicting interests over the spheres of influence they were to assume. While there were crippling internal disputes between the Allies, and the United States was reluctant to accept a mandate over Armenia, disaffected elements in the Ottoman Empire in 1920 began to disavow the decisions made by the Ottoman government in Constantinople, coalesced and formed the Turkish National Movement, under the leadership of Mustafa Kemal Pasha. The Turkish Nationalists considered any partition of formerly Ottoman lands (and subsequent distribution to non-Turkish authorities) to be unacceptable. Their avowed goal was to "guarantee the safety and unity of the country." The Bolsheviks sympathized with the Turkish Movement due to their mutual opposition to "Western Imperialism," as the Bolsheviks referred to it.

In his message to Vladimir Lenin, the leader of the Bolsheviks, dated 26 April 1920, Kemal promised to coordinate his military operations with the Bolsheviks' "fight against imperialist governments" and requested five million lira in gold as well as armaments "as first aid" to his forces. In 1920, the Lenin government supplied the Kemalists with 6,000 rifles, more than five million rifle cartridges, and 17,600 projectiles, as well as 200.6 kg of gold bullion; in the following two years the amount of aid increased. In the negotiations of the Treaty of Moscow (1921), the Bolsheviks demanded that the Turks cede Batum and Nakhichevan; they also asked for more rights in the future status of the Straits. Despite the concessions made by the Turks, the financial and military supplies were slow in coming. Only after the decisive Battle of Sakarya (August–September 1921), the aid started to flow in faster. After much delays, the Armenians received from the Allies in July 1920 about 40,000 uniforms and 25,000 rifles with a great amount of ammunition.

It was not until August 1920 that the Allies drafted the peace settlement of the Near East in the form of the Treaty of Sèvres. Under the terms of the treaty, portions of four northeastern vilayets of the Ottoman Empire were allotted to the First Republic of Armenia and subsequently came to be known as Wilsonian Armenia, after the US President Woodrow Wilson. The Treaty of Sèvres served to confirm Kemal's suspicions about Allied plans to partition the empire. According to historian Richard G. Hovannisian, Kemal's decision to order attacks on Armenian troops in Oltu District in the erstwhile Kars Oblast that eventually expanded into an invasion of Armenia proper was intended to show the Allies that "the treaty would not be accepted and that there would be no peace until the West was ready to offer new terms in keeping with the principles of the Turkish National Pact."

Active stage

Early phases

According to Turkish and Soviet sources, Turkish plans to take back formerly Ottoman-controlled lands in the east were already in place as early as June 1920. Using Turkish sources, historian Bilâl Şamşir has identified mid-June as to when exactly the Ankara government began to prepare for a campaign in the east. Hostilities were first begun by Kemalist forces. Kâzım Karabekir was assigned command of the newly formed Eastern Front on June 9, 1920 and was given authority over a field army and all civil and military officials in the Eastern Front on June 13 or 14. Skirmishes between Turkish and Armenian forces in the area surrounding Kars were frequent during that summer, although full-scale hostilities did not break out until September. Convinced that the Allies would not come to the defense of Armenia and aware that the leaders of the Republic of Armenia had failed to gain recognition of its independence by Soviet Russia, Kemal gave the order to commanding general Kâzım Karabekir to advance into Armenian-held territory. At 2:30 in the morning of September 13, five battalions from the Turkish XV Army Corps attacked Armenian positions, surprising the thinly spread and unprepared Armenian forces at Oltu and Penek. By dawn, Karabekir's forces had occupied Penek and the Armenians had suffered at least 200 casualties and been forced to retreat east towards Sarıkamış. As neither the Allied powers nor Soviet Russia reacted to Turkish operations, on September 20 Kemal authorized Karabekir to push onwards and take Kars and Kağızman.

By this time, Karabekir's XV Corps had grown to the size of four divisions. At 3:00 in the morning of September 28, the four divisions of the XV Army Corps advanced towards Sarıkamış, creating such panic that Armenian residents had abandoned the town by the time the Turks entered the next day. The armed forces started toward Kars but were delayed by Armenian resistance. In early October, the Armenian government pleaded that the Allies intervene and put a halt to the Turkish advance, but to no avail. Most of Britain's available forces in the Near East were concentrated on crushing the Kurdish tribal uprisings in Iraq with the help of the Assyrians, while France and Italy were also fighting the Turkish revolutionaries near Syria and Italian controlled Antalya. Neighboring Georgia declared neutrality during the conflict.

On October 11, Soviet plenipotentiary Boris Legran arrived in Yerevan with a text to negotiate a new Soviet-Armenian agreement. The agreement signed at October 24 secured Soviet support. The most important part of this agreement dealt with Kars, which Armenia agreed to secure. The Turkish national movement was not happy with possible agreement between the Soviets and Armenia. Karabekir was informed by the Government of the Grand National Assembly regarding the Boris Legran agreement and ordered to resolve the Kars issue. The same day the agreement between Armenia and Soviet Russia was signed, Karabekir moved his forces toward Kars.

Capture of Kars and Alexandropol

On October 24, Karabekir's forces launched a new, massive campaign against Kars. The Armenians abandoned the city, which by October 30 came under full Turkish occupation. Turkish forces continued to advance, and a week after the capture of Kars, they took control of Alexandropol (present-day Gyumri, Armenia). On November 12, the Turks also captured the strategic village of Aghin, northeast of the ruins of the former Armenian capital of Ani, and planned to move toward Yerevan. On November 13, Georgia broke its neutrality. It had concluded an agreement with Armenia to invade the disputed region of Lori, which was established as a Neutral Zone (the Shulavera Condominium) between the two nations in early 1919.

Treaty of Alexandropol 

The Turks, headquartered in Alexandropol, presented the Armenians with an ultimatum which they were forced to accept. They followed it with a more radical demand which threatened the existence of Armenia as a viable entity. The Armenians at first rejected this demand, but when Karabekir's forces continued to advance, they had little choice but to capitulate. On November 18, 1920, they concluded a cease-fire agreement. During the invasion the Turkish Army carried out mass atrocities against Armenian civilians in Kars and Alexandropol. These included rapes and massacres where tens of thousands of civilians were executed.

As the terms of defeat were being negotiated between Karabekir and Armenian Foreign Minister Alexander Khatisyan, Joseph Stalin, on the command of Vladimir Lenin, ordered Grigoriy Ordzhonikidze to enter Armenia from Azerbaijan in order to establish a new pro-Bolshevik government in the country. On the night of November 28–29, the Soviet Eleventh Army under the command of Anatoli Gekker invaded Armenia at Karavansarai (present-day Ijevan), meeting little to no resistance. That same day, the Armenian Revolutionary Committee (a committee of Armenian Bolsheviks formed in Baku a week earlier to facilitate Armenia's sovietization) declared Armenia a Soviet republic. A majority of the Armenian leadership agreed that it was impossible to resist both the Russians and the Turks and that the Armenian army and population were exhausted. Drastamat Kanayan and Hambardzum Terterian were authorized to enter negotiations with Boris Legran to accept Soviet rule in Armenia.

On 2 December 1920, the Armenian government signed an agreement with Legran declaring its resignation and the transfer of power in Armenia to a Soviet government. Drastamat Kanayan would temporarily lead the country pending the arrival of the Armenian Revolutionary Committee in Yerevan. On behalf of Soviet Russia, Legran guaranteed the restoration of Armenia's pre-war borders. The Armenian delegation led by Khatisyan signed the Treaty of Alexandropol with Kemalist Turkey on 3 December 1920, though the government it represented no longer existed, making the treaty illegal. The treaty required Armenia to disarm most of its military forces, renounce the Treaty of Sèvres, and cede the entire territory of the former Kars Oblast and the district of Surmalu to Turkey, as well as make territorial concessions to Azerbaijan in Nakhichevan. The decision to sign the illegal treaty was justified by Khatisyan as necessary to prevent Karabekir's army from advancing further and reaching Echmiadzin and Yerevan ahead of the Red Army.

Aftermath 

The Red Army entered Yerevan on December 4, 1920, joined by the Armenian Revolutionary Committee the next day. State authority in Armenia formally passed over to the committee. Finally, on December 6, the Cheka, Soviet Russia's secret police, entered Yerevan. Though nominally an independent Soviet republic, Armenia had effectively ceased to exist as an independent state. Reneging on their agreement not to subject members of the former ruling party, the Armenian Revolutionary Federation, to repressions, the new Soviet Armenian authorities arrested numerous members of the ARF and conducted expropriations in the countryside, triggering an anti-Bolshevik uprising in February 1921, during which Soviet power was briefly overthrown in Armenia. The Red Army intervened to restore Soviet authority, although anti-Bolshevik resistance continued in the southern region of Zangezur until July 1921.

Settlement

The warfare in Transcaucasia was settled in a friendship treaty between the Grand National Assembly of Turkey (GNAT) (which proclaimed the Turkish Republic in 1923), and Soviet Russia (RSFSR). The "Treaty on Friendship and Brotherhood," called the Treaty of Moscow, was signed on March 16, 1921. The succeeding Treaty of Kars, signed by the representatives of Azerbaijan SSR, Armenian SSR, Georgian SSR, and the GNAT, ceded Adjara to Soviet Georgia in exchange for the Kars territory (today the Turkish provinces of Kars, Iğdır, and Ardahan). Under the treaties, an autonomous Nakhichevan oblast was established under Azerbaijan's protectorate. The Treaty of Kars effectively confirmed Armenia's territorial losses to Turkey as stipulated by the invalid Treaty of Alexandropol and established the Armenia–Turkey border that exists to this day.

Death toll 
According to Soviet historiography, 60,000 Armenian civilians had been killed, including 30,000 men, 15,000 women, 5,000 children, and 10,000 young girls; Of the 38,000 wounded, 20,000 were men, 10,000 women, 5,000 young girls, and 3,000 children. Of the 18,000 men taken prisoner, 2,000 survived (the rest were executed or died of exposure or starvation). In 1919, there were 31,236 Armenians and 10,092 Yazidis in the Surmalu uezd (present-day Iğdır Province), and 62,007 Armenians and 27,418 Yazidis in the Kars Oblast (present-day Kars and Ardahan provinces) within Armenia. As a result of the 1920 Turkish occupation of those territories and subsequent massacre and expulsion of their inhabitants, only 59,843 Armenians and Yazidis arrived in modern-day Armenialess than half of the 130,753 Armenians and Yazidis in those areas in 1919.

A commission's findings of atrocities carried out by the Turkish invaders in Shirak revealed that a total of 11,886 corpses were buried, 90 percent of whom were women and children and 10 percent were men: In the village of Agbulag, 1,186 were killed, Ghaltakhchi – 2,100, Karaboya – 1,100, in three villages where refugees from Kars had gathered – 7,500.

See also 
 Armenia–Turkey border
 Armenian–Azerbaijani War
 Greco-Turkish War (1919–1922)
 Caucasus Campaign

Notes 

 
Conflicts in 1920
1920 in the Ottoman Empire
1920 in Armenia
Wars involving Turkey
Wars involving Armenia
Invasions of Armenia